Francesca (Fannie) Mary Gallaher aka Sydney Starr and F.M.Gallaher (30 May 1854 – 22 December 1935) was an Irish writer, novelist and teacher

Life
Gallaher was born in Cork in 1854, but the family soon moved to Dublin where she grew up. Her parents were Sarah Gallaher (born Russell) and John Blake Gallaher who was the editor of the Freeman's Journal for nearly thirty years. She had two brothers who were writers and associates of James Joyce. She went to Alexandra College and she was then employed there as a teacher. However she was also a writer and in 1880 her novel Katty the flash: a mould of Dublin mud was published and the same year her publishers also released A Son of Man under the same pseudonym of Sydney Starr. Katty the Flash was successful and it was republished in the New York Sun and the Temple Bar magazine. The Temple Bar attributed it to "Miss Gallaher", but the New York Sun was criticised for allowing it to be amended and published under the name of her rival May Laffan Hartley. Gallaher's letter of protest to the plagiarism and unwelcome changes to her story were published in 1883 and the New York Sun was criticised by the Weekly Irish Times. The confusion continued with a modern index still attributing Gallaher's story to Hartley. Later critics have noted the stories "urban realism" whilst representing women as significant figures who are either good or bad.

She wrote stories for children that were published in the 1880s.

In 1884 she was engaged as personal private secretary to Adeline Marie Russell who was the Duchess of Bedford and a campaigner for penal reform. Gallaher continued in this job until 1920 when Russell died and left her with an annuity of £400 per year.

Gallaher wrote books on the teaching of domestic science that were used in schools in northern Ireland and were considered essential for new families by The Dublin Journal of Medical Science.

Death and legacy
Fannie Gallaher died at St. Georges Retreat, nursing home in Ditchling, Sussex on 22 December 1935.  Probate London 4th March to The Public Trustee effects to the sum of £8,245 12s 6d. An anthology notes that Gallaher and Laffan's works described Irish urban settings in a new way that was continued by James Joyce and James Stephens.

References 

1854 births
People from Cork (city)
Irish novelists
People educated at Alexandra College
1935 deaths